Johannes Abraham "Johan" de Meij (born November 23, 1953 in Voorburg) is a Dutch conductor, trombonist, and composer, best known for his Symphony No. 1 for wind ensemble, nicknamed The Lord of the Rings symphony.

Biography 

Johan de Meij received his musical training at the Royal Conservatory of The Hague, where he studied trombone and conducting. His Symphony No. 1, The Lord of the Rings, received the Sudler Composition Prize and has been recorded by ensembles including The London Symphony Orchestra, The North Netherlands Orchestra, The Nagoya Philharmonic Orchestra, and The Amsterdam Wind Orchestra.

Before turning exclusively to composing and conducting, Johan de Meij played trombone and euphonium; he performed with major ensembles in The Netherlands. He is the principal guest conductor of the New York Wind Symphony and the Kyushu Wind Orchestra in Fukuoka, Japan; he is a regular guest conductor of the Simón Bolívar Youth Wind Orchestra in Caracas, Venezuela, part of the Venezuelan educational system El Sistema. He is founder and CEO of the publishing company Amstel Music, which he established in 1989. When not traveling, de Meij divides his time between Hudson Valley and Manhattan with his wife Dyan.

His Symphony No. 1 "The Lord of the Rings", first performed in 1988, won the Sudler Composition Award in 1989. It has been recorded by several orchestras.

Works 

 1979 Patchwork for brass sextet
 1984-1988 Symphony No. 1 "The Lord of the Rings"
 1988 Loch Ness - A Scottish Fantasy
 1989 Aquarium opus 5
 1993 Symphony No. 2 "The Big Apple" (A New York Symphony)
 1995 Polish Christmas Music- Part 1 (based on the Polish Christmas carols Poklon Jezusowi; Mizerna, cicha; Aniol pasterzom mówil; Gdy sliczna Panna and Jam jest dudka)
1995 Jazz Suite No.2 (of Dmitri Shostakovich) Classical transcription for symphonic/fanfare band
1996 T-Bone Concerto for trombone and concert band
1997 Continental Overture
1998 La Quintessenza
2000 Casanova for cello solo and symphonic wind orchestra
2002 The Venetian Collection
Klezmer Classics for wind orchestra
The Wind in the Willows
2005 Extreme Make-over (Testpiece for the European Brass Band Contest 2005, Groningen-NL)
2005 Ceremonial Fanfare
2006 Symphony No. 3 "Planet Earth"
2006 Windy City Overture - commissioned by the Northshore Concert Band
2007 Canticles for Bass Trombone and Wind Orchestra
2007 Festive Hymn
2008 Dutch Masters Suite
2009? Evolution 
2010 Spring - Overture for Wind Orchestra
2010 At Kitty O'Sheas (Irish Folk Song Suite)
2011 Cloud Factory
2011 "Songs from the Catskills"
2011? Sinfonietta no. 1 (for brass band)
2012 UFO Concerto for Euphonium
2013 Symphony No. 4 "Sinfonie der Lieder" (to texts by Friedrich Rückert, Heinrich Heine, and Hugo von Hofmannsthal)
 2013 Basilica sacra
 2013 Summer
 2014 Downtown divertimento
 Madurodam
 Pentagram
 R.O.K Navy Fanfare
 2019 Symphony No. 5 "Return to Middle Earth"
 2022 The Painted Bird

References

External links
 

1953 births
Living people
20th-century classical composers
20th-century classical trombonists
20th-century conductors (music)
20th-century Dutch male musicians
21st-century classical composers
21st-century classical trombonists
21st-century conductors (music)
21st-century Dutch male musicians
Brass band composers
Concert band composers
Dutch classical composers
Dutch classical trombonists
Dutch conductors (music)
Dutch male classical composers
Male conductors (music)
Male trombonists
People from Voorburg
Royal Conservatory of The Hague alumni